The Georgian House is a British children's historical fantasy television series produced by HTV in Bristol and first screened on ITV in 1976. The series consisted of seven episodes.

Plot 

The story concerned two students, Dan and Abbie, who arrive at a reconstructed Georgian House in Bristol, which is open for guided tours. They work there as tour guides along with the caretaker. While there, they discover an African wood carving which takes hold of the teenagers and transports them back 200 years to a time when the house was owned by the Leadbetter family. They are accepted as part of the household as Abbie is seen as a visiting cousin and Dan is a bullied houseboy. While there, they meet a young Negro slave, Ngo who is owned by the Leadbetters. Abbie is desperate to set him free, but Dan is keen to get back to their own time. They discover that Ngo is the only one who can help them get back and they work together. Abbie and Dan succeed in setting Ngo free and they make it back to their own time.

Cast 
The two teenage leads were played by Spencer Banks, who had made his name earlier in the decade as Simon in the science-fiction series, Timeslip, while Abbie was played by the unknown Adrienne Byrne. Well known actor Jack Watson played the Caretaker. Playing the slave boy Ngo, child actor Brinsley Forde was cast. Forde later became more famous as a member of 1980s reggae-pop group, Aswad. Characters from the 18th-century were: Peter Scofield (Leadbetter), Constance Chapman (Mistress Anne), Janine Duvitski (Ariadne), Monica Lavers (Maid), Anne Blake (Madame Lavarre), Stephen Holton (Footman), Dudley Jones (Hezekiah Allsop), and Anna Quayle (Miss Humphreys)  
.

Episodes 
 "New Recruits" (2/1/76)
 "We'll Never Get Back" (9/1/76)
 "Treachery" (16/1/76)
 "A Dose of Sulphur Water" (23/1/76)
 "Duwamba" (30/1/76)
 "Trapped" (6/2/76)
 "Look to Your Future" (13/2/76)

Availability 

Today, only three episodes of the series exist in the HTV archive. These are episodes 1, 3 and 7, with the remaining four believed to have been wiped. Despite this, archive TV specialists Network DVD released the three remaining episodes on a single DVD on 24 May 2010. PDF files of the scripts represented the 'lost' episodes 2, 4, 5 and 6 allowing the narrative to be understood.

References

External links 
 

1976 British television series debuts
1976 British television series endings
1970s British children's television series
British children's science fiction television series
British time travel television series
ITV children's television shows
Television series by ITV Studios
Television shows produced by Harlech Television (HTV)
English-language television shows